The Georgian-Ottoman War of 1599 was a conflict between Simon I of the Kingdom of Kartli and the Ottoman forces of Cafer Pasha, beylerbey of Tabriz.

Background
In 1598 Simon I of Kartli rebelled against the Ottoman Empire and ceased his annual tribute payments. Simon I took back the fortress of Gori from the Ottomans after a nine month long siege, as a result the Ottomans feared that revolts would spread throughout other regions of the southern Caucasus. The Ottomans immediately took action and launched a punitive expedition against Simon I. The Ottomans sent Cafer Pasha, the beylerbey of Tabriz against the Georgians.

Battle
When King Simon I learnt that an Ottoman army was marching against him he went out to face them. The Ottomans marched into the Algeti valley where a Georgian army gathered at Nakhiduri. A major battle took place at Nakhiduri and King Simon I led the initial charge. After five hours of fighting the Ottomans defeated the Georgians and the Georgians were forced to flee the battlefield. During the pursuit of the Georgians by the Ottomans, King Simon I was captured by the Turks near the village of  Partskhisi.

Aftermath
King Simon, who was taken captive, was brought to Istanbul and imprisoned in Yedikule. During his imprisonment, he converted to Islam and took the name Mehmed Pasha. As a Muslim, he died in captivity.

References

Battles involving the Ottoman Empire
1590s in military history